is a manga award sponsored by TSUTAYA, a major chain of rental and sales stores for books, music software, and video software.

Overview 
The first award was held in 2017 as a celebration of Tsutaya stores, until 2018 the awards were divided into 4 categories (Next Break, All time best, Anime hope, Live action hope). From the 3rd award in 2019 onwards only "Next Break" was available. The concept of the award is to decide the Next Break not by nomination or recommendation, but only by user vote. For the Next Break, the conditions are that the work must be within 5 volumes and unfinished.

Winners and candidates

2017

Notes
 Voting period: April 17 - May 21, 2017.
 Announcement date: June 15, 2017.

2018

Notes
 Voting period: May 18 - June 10, 2018.
 Announcement date: July 16, 2018.

2019

Notes
 Voting period: May 17 - June 9, 2019.
 Announcement date: July 18, 2019.

2020

Notes
 Voting period: April 1 - May 17, 2020
 Announcement date: June 17, 2020.

2021

Notes
 Voting period: April 1 - May 17, 2021
 Announcement date: June 15, 2021.

2022

Notes
 Voting period: April 1 - May 17, 2022
 Announcement date: June 15, 2022.

References

External links 
 TSUTAYA Comic Award

Awards established in 2017
Manga awards